Dalbergia maritima is a species of legume in the family Fabaceae; it is a rosewood, and its wood is often referred to as Bois de Rose.
It is found only in Madagascar. It is threatened by habitat loss due to the over-consumption of its species.

Similar species
 Dalbergia occulta, also found only in Madagascar, and similarly threatened.

References

maritima
Endemic flora of Madagascar
Endangered plants
Taxonomy articles created by Polbot